Tirtha is an album by pianist Vijay Iyer with Prasanna and Nitin Mitta recorded in 2008 and released on the ACT label in 2011.

Reception

The album received universal acclaim with Metacritic giving it a score of 81 from 8 reviews. Thom Jurek, in his review for AllMusic states, "Tirtha is a triumph; it is a high-water mark in hearing the constantly evolving discussion between jazz and Indian music". Writing for All About Jazz, Mark F. Turner said "the recording crosses the channels of jazz and Indian music, eschewing the hybridization of the two styles; a semblance of familiarity but also something entirely fresh. The nine tracks contain robust elements of ethnicity, thriving improvisation, and exhaustive composition; steeped in modern and old worlds". The Guardian review by John Fordham awarded the album 4 stars noting "Iyer and his partners sound like a spontaneous ensemble from the outset – not self-conscious participants in a fusion experiment".

Track listing
All compositions by Vijay Iyer except as indicated
 "Duality" - 5:59
 "Tribal Wisdom" (Prasanna) - 11:06
 "Tirtha" - 7:04
 "Abundance" - 7:46
 "Falsehood" (Prasanna) - 6:38
 "Gauntlet" - 2:10
 "Polytheism" (Prasanna) - 5:43
 "Remembrance" - 6:09
 "Entropy and Time" (Prasanna based on a composition by T.R. Subramanyam) - 7:58

Personnel
 Vijay Iyer — piano
 Prasanna — guitar, voice
Nitin Mitta — tabla

References

2011 albums
Vijay Iyer albums
ACT Music albums
Instrumental albums